In 2018, five of the eleven seats of the San Francisco Board of Supervisors were on the ballot in the 2018 San Francisco Board of Supervisors elections. A special election was held on June 5 for one of the five seats, while the other four were decided on the November 6 general election ballot. The elections followed the ranked-choice voting format.

Results

District 2 

Incumbent Supervisor Mark Farrell was ineligible to run for reelection due to term limits. On January 23, 2018, he was appointed interim mayor, succeeding London Breed, who had been acting mayor since the death of Ed Lee. Farrell appointed Catherine Stefani as his successor, and she announced she would run for a full term in the election.

Kat Anderson, a labor attorney; Schuyler Hudak, a startup founder; and Nick Josefowitz, the San Francisco BART Board Director, are candidates. Former Supervisor Michela Alioto-Pier was considered a potential candidate, but a ballot proposition on the June 2018 ballot limiting Supervisors to two terms in their lifetime, rather than the present two consecutive term limit, prevented Alioto-Pier from running for a third term.

District 4

Incumbent Supervisor Katy Tang was eligible to run for reelection, but announced her intention not to seek re-election. Candidates to succeed her included Gordon Mar, Li Miao Lovett, Jessica Ho, Lou Ann Bassan, Arthur Tom, and Trevor McNeil. Tang supported Ho, who worked for Tang as a legislative aide.

District 6

Incumbent Supervisor Jane Kim was ineligible to run for reelection due to term limits. Matt Haney, Christine Johnson, Sonja Trauss and Jason Jones ran to succeed her.

District 8

Incumbent Supervisor Jeff Sheehy was eligible to run for reelection in the June 5, 2018 special election. He ran for reelection against Rafael Mandelman and Lawrence "Stark" Dagesse. Mandelman won the seat, with 60% of the vote, while Sheehy received 38%. Mandelman was sworn in on July 11. Mandelman and Dagasse ran again in the November election, but Sheehy did not.

District 10

Incumbent Supervisor Malia Cohen was ineligible to run for reelection due to term limits. Candidates who ran to succeed her included President of the San Francisco Board of Education Shamann Walton, Theo Ellington, and Tony Kelly.

References

External links 
City and County of San Francisco Department of Elections

San Francisco Board of Supervisors
San Francisco Board of Supervisors
Board of Supervisors 2018
Elections Board of Supervisors